Mamadi Sano (born 1944) is a Guinean former footballer. He competed in the men's tournament at the 1968 Summer Olympics.

References

External links
 

1944 births
Living people
Guinean footballers
Guinea international footballers
Olympic footballers of Guinea
Footballers at the 1968 Summer Olympics
Association football goalkeepers